Plaumannium is a genus of ground beetles in the family Carabidae. This genus has a single species, Plaumannium denticolle. It is found in Argentina and Brazil.

References

Platyninae